James Harris (born June 2, 1982) is an American former professional arena football player who was a fullback/linebacker.

Early life
The son of Ronnie and Bertha Harris, James attended Thomson High School in Thomson, Georgia, where he lettered twice in two season of football.

College career
Harris continued his athletic career at Albany State University, where he lettered three seasons and led the team in tackles and sacks his sophomore, junior and senior seasons.

Professional career

South Georgia Wildcats
Started professional playing career with the South Georgia Wildcats of AF2 in 2006. He played the 2007 and 2008 season under VooDoo head football coach Derek Stingley. Harris was named to the All-AF2 team in 2008.

Bossier-Shreveport Battle Wings
In 2009, Harris played with the Bossier-Shreveport Battle Wings, also of AF2.

Albany Panthers
Harris spent the 2010 season with the Albany Panthers of the Southern Indoor Football League. In only nine games for the Panthers, he led the team in sacks (6.5) and tackles for a loss (9.0)

New Orleans VooDoo
In 2011, Harris signed to play with the New Orleans VooDoo of the Arena Football League.

References

1982 births
Living people
American football linebackers
Albany State Golden Rams football players
South Georgia Wildcats players
Bossier–Shreveport Battle Wings players
New Orleans VooDoo players
Albany Panthers players